Mattias Wiklöf (born 24 May 1979) is a Swedish footballer. After playing in the Veikkausliiga with IFK Mariehamn on two occasions, he semi-retired in 2014 with IK Tord.

References

 
 
 

1979 births
Living people
Swedish footballers
Superettan players
Veikkausliiga players
Sandvikens IF players
IFK Mariehamn players
IK Brage players
Swedish expatriate footballers
Expatriate footballers in Finland
Swedish expatriate sportspeople in Finland
Association football forwards